Chonos may refer to:
 Chonos tribe, a Mongolian tribe of Russia, Mongolia and China
 Chono people, an extinct culture of Chile
 Chonos Archipelago, in Chile
 Chonos Metamorphic Complex, in Chile